Commelina dianthifolia, known as the birdbill dayflower, is a perennial herb native to mountains in the south-western United States (Arizona, Colorado, New Mexico, Texas) and northern Mexico. Petals are blue while sepals are green. The inflorescence is a scorpioid cyme and it is subtended by a boat-like spathe.

Uses
An infusion of plant used by Keres people as a strengthener for weakened tuberculosis patients.
The Ramah Navajo give a cold simple or compound infusion to livestock as an aphrodisiac.

References

dianthifolia
Flora of Arizona
Flora of Colorado
Flora of New Mexico
Flora of Texas
Flora of Mexico
Plants used in traditional Native American medicine